Metellina is a genus of tetragnathid spiders that occurs mostly in Eurasia, with two species found in North America. M. segmentata was introduced to Canada.

Some researchers consider this genus to belong to a distinct family, the Metidae.

M. segmentata is probably the most abundant orb-weaving spider of Germany.

Name
The genus name is an alteration of the related genus Meta.

Species
, the World Spider Catalog accepted the following extant species:
Metellina barreti (Kulczyński, 1899) – Madeira
Metellina curtisi (McCook, 1894) (type species) – North America
Metellina gertschi (Lessert, 1938) – Democratic Republic of the Congo
Metellina haddadi Marusik & Larsen, 2018 – South Africa
Metellina kirgisica (Bakhvalov, 1974) – Azerbaijan, Central Asia, China
Metellina longipalpis (Pavesi, 1883) – Ethiopia
Metellina mengei (Blackwall, 1869) – Europe to Caucasus, Iran, Russia (Europe to Altai)
Metellina merianae (Scopoli, 1763) – Europe, Caucasus, Turkey, Iran, Russia (Europe to Central Asia)
Metellina merianopsis (Tullgren, 1910) – Tanzania
Metellina mimetoides Chamberlin & Ivie, 1941 – North America
Metellina minima (Denis, 1953) – Canary Islands
Metellina orientalis (Spassky, 1932) – Turkey, Armenia, Iran, Kazakhstan, Turkmenistan
Metellina ornata (Chikuni, 1955) – Russia (Far East), China, Korea, Japan
Metellina segmentata (Clerck, 1757) – Europe, Turkey, Israel, Caucasus, Russia (Europe) to Central Asia, China, Japan; introduced to Canada
Metellina villiersi (Denis, 1955) – Guinea

References

Tetragnathidae
Araneomorphae genera
Spiders of Asia
Spiders of North America
Taxa named by Ralph Vary Chamberlin
Taxa named by Wilton Ivie